Annabelle Dreville (born 4 March 1995) is a French former professional road racing cyclist, who rode professionally between 2016 and 2018 for UCI Women's Teams  and . She won a bronze medal in the under-23 road race at the 2014 European Road Championships. Dreville represented her country in the time trial and road race at the 2015 European Games in Baku, Azerbaijan.

Major results

2014
 UEC European Under-23 Road Championships
3rd  Road race
9th Time trial
 7th Chrono des Nations
2015
 9th Overall Gracia–Orlová
2018
 3rd Road race, National Road Championships

References

External links

1995 births
Living people
Sportspeople from Beauvais
French female cyclists
Cyclists at the 2015 European Games
European Games competitors for France
Cyclists from Hauts-de-France